Terence Richard Norris (born 9 June 1930) is an Australian stage, television and film actor, and politician. As an actor, he has starred in TV shows such as Bellbird and Cop Shop, and in films like Romulus, My Father, The Chronicles of Narnia: The Voyage of the Dawn Treader and Paper Planes. He interrupted his show business career for 10 years with a stint serving in state politics, for the Labor Party with the Victorian Legislative Assembly.

Early and personal life
Norris was born in Melbourne to a boilermaker. He is married to the English-born Australian Julia Blake, and has 3 children: Dominic, Jane and Sarah.

Acting career

Theatre
He started his career in the 1950s and early 1960s when he worked as an actor in England, appearing in repertory theatre in Bradford, Huddersfield and York among other places, before returning to Australia in 1963. He has performed in numerous theatre roles and is also a playwright.

Television
He is possibly best known for two long-running television series roles. He played Joe Turner in Bellbird from 1969 until the series ended in 1977. He then played Senior sergeant Eric O'Reilly in police series Cop Shop starting December 1977. Norris has also appeared in the television series Bobby Dazzler and The Last of the Australians.

Film 
His most recent film roles are in Romulus, My Father in 2007,  The Chronicles of Narnia: The Voyage of the Dawn Treader in 2010,  Paper Planes and Looking for Grace both in 2015, and Mortal Engines in 2018.

Political career
Norris left Cop Shop in 1982 to pursue a career in state politics by standing for a seat in the Victorian Legislative Assembly. He was the Australian Labor Party member for Noble Park from 1982 to 1985 and then for Dandenong from 1985 to 1992.

Awards

Nominations

Filmography

References

External links
 

|-

1930 births
Living people
Australian actor-politicians
Australian male film actors
Australian male television actors
Australian male stage actors
Members of the Victorian Legislative Assembly
Australian Labor Party members of the Parliament of Victoria
Logie Award winners
Male actors from Melbourne
Politicians from Melbourne